The 39th District of the Iowa Senate is located in southeastern Iowa, and is currently composed of Johnson, Keokuk, and Washington Counties.

Current elected officials
Kevin Kinney is the senator currently representing the 39th District.

The area of the 39th District contains two Iowa House of Representatives districts:
The 77th District (represented by Amy Nielsen)
The 78th District (represented by Jarad Klein)

The district is also located in Iowa's 2nd congressional district, which is represented by Mariannette Miller-Meeks.

Past senators
The district has previously been represented by:

William Palmer, 1983–1992
James Riordan, 1993–1994
Jo Ann Douglas, 1995–1998
Jo Ann Johnson, 1999–2002
David Lord, 2002
Joe Bolkcom, 2003–2012
Sandy Greiner, 2013–2014
Kevin Kinney, 2015–present

See also
Iowa General Assembly
Iowa Senate

References

39